Amyna amplificans is a moth in the family Noctuidae first described by Francis Walker in 1858. It is found from Guatemala and Costa Rica and Venezuela. A single specimen was collected in the Huachuca Mountains in south-eastern Arizona.

References

Moths described in 1858
Eustrotiinae
Moths of North America
Moths of South America